Palloptera ustulata is a species of fly in the family Pallopteridae. It is found in the  Palearctic.

References

Pallopteridae
Insects described in 1820
Muscomorph flies of Europe